Pope Theodore may refer to:
Pope Theodore I (died 649), Jerusalem-born Greek
Pope Theodore II, Pope in 897 AD, son of Photius
Antipope Theodore, antipope in 687 AD
Pope Tawadros I of Alexandria (Theodorus or Theodosius), 45th Pope of Alexandria & Patriarch of the See of St. Mark.
Pope Tawadros II of Alexandria or Theodore II, elected Coptic Pope in 2012

Theodore